The Délvidék football team represents the Hungarian minority in Vojvodina, an autonomous province of Serbia. It is a member of ConIFA, an umbrella association for states, minorities, stateless peoples and regions unaffiliated with FIFA.

See also 
Délvidék
 Felvidék football team 
 Kárpátalja football team 
 Székely Land football team

References 

CONIFA member associations
European national and official selection-teams not affiliated to FIFA
Délvidék national football team
Hungarian minorities in Europe